The Greens of the Community of Madrid (LVCM) is a Spanish political party.

References

Political parties in the Community of Madrid